The Chief Secretary of Ceylon, was the Chairman and one of three officers of state of the Board of Ministers of the State Council of Ceylon from 1932 to 1947. The post succeeded that of Colonial Secretary which was one of six offices that held a seat in the Executive Council of Ceylon until 1932.

The established under in 1932 by the Order in Council, following the recommendations of the Donoughmore Commission, vested the subjects of External Affairs, Defence and the Public Services of the Crown Colony of Ceylon under the Chief Secretary, who served as the Officer Administering the Government in the abases of the Governor.  As such Chief Secretary was third in the order of precedence after the Governor of Ceylon and the Chief Justice.    

The Chief Secretary was assisted by a Deputy Chief Secretary and two Assistant Chief Secretaries. Appointments were made from senior officers of the Colonial Service. The post ceased to exist in 1947 with the formation of the Dominion of Ceylon. Chief Secretary's office was located in the Secretariat and the Temple Trees was the official residence of the Chief Secretary. The post was replaced by the post of Prime Minister of Ceylon in 1947 under the recommendations of the Soulbury Commission under the Ceylon Independence Act, 1947 and The Ceylon (Constitution and Independence) Orders in Council 1947.

Departments
Departments under the Chief Secretary's office:

 Secretariat 
 Ceylon Civil Service
 Ceylon Clerical Service
 Ceylon Defence Force
 Ceylon Naval Volunteer Force
 Coasts Lights
 Censor's Department
 Information Officer's Department

List of Secretaries
Data based on:
 John Ferguson, Ceylon in the "jubilee Year"., J. Haddon and Co.,1887
 Ceylon: Its History, People, Commerce, Industries and Resources, Plâté limited, 1924

See also
Chief secretary (British Empire)
Governors of British Ceylon
General Officer Commanding, Ceylon
Attorney General of Sri Lanka
Auditor General of Sri Lanka
Treasurer of Ceylon
 Legal Secretary of Ceylon
 Financial Secretary of Ceylon

References

Defunct government positions in Sri Lanka